Dombeya longebracteolata is a species of flowering plant in the family Malvaceae. It is found only in Ethiopia.

References

longebracteolata
Endemic flora of Ethiopia
Vulnerable plants
Taxonomy articles created by Polbot